Henry Sturgis Morgan Jr. (August 10, 1924 – May 6, 2011) was a United States Navy rear admiral and maritime lawyer. Through his father, Morgan Stanley co-founder Henry Sturgis Morgan Sr., he was a great-grandson of J. P. Morgan, founder of J.P. Morgan & Co.

Early life
Henry Sturgis Morgan Jr. was born August 10, 1924, in Oyster Bay, New York to Henry Sturgis Morgan Sr. (1900–1982) and Catherine Frances Lovering Adams (1902–1988), the daughter of Frances Lovering and Charles Francis Adams III, the U.S. Secretary of the Navy under Herbert Hoover, and a descendant of U.S. Presidents John Adams and John Quincy Adams. His younger brother was John Adams Morgan (b. 1930).

Morgan graduated Groton School and Harvard University class of 1946.

Career

Morgan joined the Navy in 1942 and was commissioned in 1944. Morgan commanded  from June 29, 1957, to May 4, 1959;  from May 25, 1966, to February 7, 1968;  from February 3 to June 22, 1971; the Fourteenth Naval District, Pearl Harbor beginning in December 1971 and was Commander Naval Forces Korea from June 1972 to April 1975.

Morgan received the Legion of Merit.

Morgan practiced maritime law as of counsel to the Admiralty practice group of the firm Vinson & Elkins for twelve years, from 1978 to 1990.

Personal life
On March 28, 1945, he married Fanny Gray Little of Chestnut Hill, Massachusetts. Before their divorce in 1972, they had four children:

 Catherine Adams Morgan, who married Alec Mitchell Peltier in 1967.
 Henry Sturgis Morgan III (b. 1948)
 Polly Morgan, who married John M. Timken Jr. in 1979.
 Joan Morgan, who married Peter Lincoln Folsom in 1973.

His second wife was Jean Alexandra McCain (1934–2019), daughter of Admiral John S. McCain, Jr. (1911–1981) and sister of U.S. Senator John McCain (1936–2018), and was married to her for 38 years until his death. He died in Annapolis, Maryland, on May 6, 2011, aged 86, and was buried at Arlington National Cemetery.

References

External links
Obituary of Henry Sturgis Morgan Jr.
Commander, U.S. Naval Forces Korea
Roster of Commanders of the Fourteenth Naval District 

1924 births
2011 deaths
People from Oyster Bay (town), New York
Military personnel from New York (state)
Adams political family
United States Navy personnel of World War II
United States Navy personnel of the Korean War
United States Navy personnel of the Vietnam War
Burials at Arlington National Cemetery
George Washington University Law School alumni
Groton School alumni
Harvard University alumni
House of Morgan
Recipients of the Legion of Merit
McCain family
Morgan family
United States Navy admirals
United States submarine commanders